Labouchere or Labouchère may refer to:

Labouchere (paddle steamer)
François de Labouchère (1917–1942), French aviator
Henry Labouchere, 1st Baron Taunton (1798–1869), British politician
Henry Labouchère (1831–1912), British politician
Jacques Labouchere, American singer-songwriter
Labouchère system, gambling strategy
Labouchere Amendment, British law

See also
 Labouchère (surname)